The Missouri Folklore Society was organized December 15, 1906, "to encourage the collection, preservation and study of folklore in the widest sense, including customs, institutions, beliefs, signs, legends, language, literature, musical arts, and folk arts and crafts of all ethnic groups throughout the State of Missouri."

The roots of MFS go back to a meeting held in the offices of the English Department at the University of Missouri at the turn of the twentieth century. The "Writer’s Club" expressed interest in "folksongs and literary material to be found in Missouri," as reported in the M.S.U. Independent on March 6, 1903. The State Historical Society of Missouri had recently opened its library in what is now Jesse Hall, and the cultural moment had arrived for the development of a new academic field which would blend the materials and methods of many traditional disciplines – philology, literature and history—as well as connecting to the newer fields of sociology and anthropology. In literature, the movement that would come to be known as "local color" and the political disposition known as populism worked together to prosper an interest in what Ralph Waldo Emerson had called for, long ago, in a genuinely American literary culture: rejecting "the courtly muses of Europe" in favor of "the near, the low, the common." 
 
The students of the English Club conceived of what would now be called a project in fieldwork and salvage ethnography; aware that sociological trends did not favor the preservation of materials of limited distribution and held in oral tradition, and probably feeling, as some Midwestern students perhaps continue to do, that their own culture hardly qualified as such in the eyes of more prestigious institutions on the Eastern seaboard, they proposed to gather the lore of Missouri into bound volumes, as an archive for future researchers. This collection project, with leadership from the English Club's faculty sponsor, Henry Marvin Belden and its secretary-treasurer, Maude Williams, would form the basis for the society's single most-cited work, Ballads and Songs Collected by the Missouri Folklore Society, published in 1940 (second edition, 1955; reprinted 1966 and 1973).
 
The collection project was an item of discussion at the 1905 meeting of the Modern Language Society in Chicago, where the fact that ancient ballads continued to be sung in rural areas was received as something of a revelation, though one to which the "popular antiquities" orientation of incipient folklore studies was favorably disposed. In addition to a very local sort of patriotism, the primary warrant for preserving a given text was that it could be traced to a prior tradition (especially one documentable in the British Isles, ideally in Thomas Percy’s 1765  Reliques of Ancient English Poetry or the English and Scottish Popular Ballads (1882-98) of Francis James Child. Belden published results of his students’ researches in Modern Philology and the Journal of American Folklore, and the club had achieved sufficient stability as to establish itself officially on December 15, 1906. 
 
The innovations here are numerous: the recognition of fieldwork as an academic enterprise, the development of collection and archiving protocols, and the participation of undergraduates in original research (a novelty which lies behind such projects as the Foxfire books, Bittersweet and The Chariton Collector). Early proceedings indicate keen awareness of the dual orientations of the society, both to literature and to anthropology. From an early date, there was recognition of the need to collect the lore of the state's Black and Native American communities. The Missouri Folklore Society provided the impetus (and expertise) for other such organizations, notably the Texas Folklore Society. Belden became prominent in national folklore circles, serving as president of the American Folklore Society and working closely with such period luminaries as the anthropologist Franz Boas and the literary scholar George Lyman Kittredge – again testifying to the new discipline's divided identity. Unfortunately, nothing came of the American Folklore Society's plans, much discussed in 1917,  to publish the Missouri collection (which was substantially what it would be on its 1940 appearance).
 
The society did not participate in the virtual explosion of amateur and academic activity, the formation of organizations and the implementation of collection projects, which extended through the 1920s and 30s. As a result of a combination of factors, including disappointment over the derailment of the organization's signature project, but perhaps primarily because of a failure of continuity in leadership and philosophy, the society "fell into a coma in 1920 from which it has not recovered." Belden became increasingly busy with administrative duties and other research projects, as was the case too with what then seemed a fine choice for Belden's successor, Archer Taylor. Mary Alicia Owen, the most prominent of early Missouri collectors and for decades a leader in the society,  did not share Belden's focused enthusiasm for folksong, preferring to cast the net much more broadly.
 
For these and other reasons, the society as such effectively went silent until 1977, though Missouri folklorists certainly remained active, and Missouri folklore continued to be collected and studied by such as Ward Dorrance, Vance Randolph, Joseph Carrière, R.P. Christeson, Rosemary Thomas and others. A group consisting mainly of University of Missouri faculty met on March 30, 1977, for the re-activation of the society. The re-incarnation of MFS, led by Adolph and Rebecca Schroeder, Don Holliday and Cathy Barton (among others), was well-prepared with broad publicity and grass-roots participation from throughout the state. The basic frameworks for the annual Missouri Folklore Society Journal (long edited by Donald Lance) and the statewide meeting, to be held each year in a different part of the state, with such prominent keynote speakers as Roger Abrahams and Max Hunter, were established.

Perhaps most importantly for the continued existence and success of the society, there was an explicit recognition of the need to participate in multiple networks of likeminded organizations (for example the Ozarks States Folklore Society), and above all to recognize the legitimate participation of a variety of constituencies and stakeholders in folklore: academic scholars, certainly, but also performers, tradition-bearers, informants -- "amateurs" in the truest and best sense of the word. Each annual meeting has had presentations and participation by such scholars of international standing as John Miles Foley, Elaine Lawless, Barry Bergey, Alain Jabbour and Jan Harold Brunvand, as well as reports on collection-efforts by students and members of local historical societies, remembrance sessions, presentations on crafts, and music sessions.
 
The society has, at the century mark, its largest membership in history, a well-trafficked website which includes a growing repository of studies and documents (Missouri Folklore Studies) and a journal now well past the quarter-century mark.

References

{note: the history of the Missouri Folklore Society was written up for the annual Missouri Folklore Society Journal  by Susan Pentlin and Rebecca B. Schroeder in the MFSJ VIII-IX (1986-87:1-44). The article above was adapted from this essay, with permission from MFS}.

External links
  The Missouri Folklore Society

1906 establishments in Missouri
Historical societies in Missouri
Missouri folklore
Organizations based in Columbia, Missouri
Organizations established in 1906
Professional associations based in the United States